The 2013 Denver Outlaws season was the eighth season for the Outlaws in Major League Lacrosse. The Outlaws completed the league's first perfect regular season, compiling a 14–0 record and returned to the playoffs for the eighth consecutive time but lost to the Charlotte Hounds in the semifinal by a 17–14 score. In the process, goaltender Jesse Schwartzman has set an MLL record for fewest goals allowed per game at 9.67 beating his previous 2011 record of 9.87.

Regular season

Schedule

Postseason

Standings

References

External links
Team Website 

Denver Outlaws seasons
Denver Outlaws
Denver Outlaws